The 2009 Women's Pan-American Volleyball Cup was the eighth edition of the annual women's volleyball tournament, played by eleven countries from June 24 to July 5, 2009 in Miami, Florida. The intercontinental event served as a qualifier for the 2010 FIVB World Grand Prix.

Competing Nations

Squads

Preliminary round

Group A

Friday June 26, 2009

Saturday June 27, 2009

Sunday June 28, 2009

Monday June 29, 2009

Tuesday June 30, 2008

Group B

Friday June 26, 2009

Saturday June 27, 2009

Sunday June 28, 2009

Monday June 29, 2009

Tuesday June 30, 2009

Final round

Classification 5–10
Thursday July 2, 2009

Quarterfinals
Thursday July 2, 2009

Classification 9
Friday July 3, 2009

Classification 5–8
Friday July 3, 2009

Semifinals
Friday July 3, 2009

Classification 10–11, 7–8, 5–6
Saturday July 4, 2009

Finals
Saturday July 4, 2009

Final ranking

Brazil, Dominican Republic, Puerto Rico and the United States qualified for the 2010 World Grand Prix

Individual awards

Most Valuable Player

Best Scorer

Best Spiker

Best Blocker

Best Server

Best Digger

Best Setter

Best Receiver

Best Libero

Rising Star

References
 NORCECA Results
 USA Volleyball
 USA Volleyball

Women's Pan-American Volleyball Cup
Pan-American Volleyball Cup
2009 in sports in Florida
2009 in American sports
International volleyball competitions hosted by the United States
Volleyball in Florida